Farletuzumab (MORAb-003) is a humanized monoclonal antibody of IgG1/κ which is being investigated for the treatment of ovarian cancer.

This drug was developed by Morphotek, Inc.

It is targeted at folate receptor alpha (FRα) which is overexpressed in some cancers such as epithelial ovarian cancer (EOC) and non-small-cell lung carcinoma.

Mechanism of action 
Farletuzumab uses the following mechanisms of action:

 Antibody-dependent cellular cytotoxicity
 Complement-dependent cytotoxicity
 Inhibition of interaction between FRα and Lyn kinase
 Induces cell death associated with autophagy

Adverse effects 
Common adverse effects include hypersensitivity reactions, fever, chills, headache, fatigue, and diarrhea.

References 

Monoclonal antibodies